Peter Bracken (born 1931) is an Australian former rugby league footballer who played in the 1950s.

A St George Dragons junior from Arncliffe, New South Wales, Peter Bracken played President's Cup for St. George in 1950 and was graded the following year. Bracken played one full season of first grade for the St George Dragons in 1953, replacing the previous year's halfback Ron Stanton. The highlight of his Dragons career was his selection in the 1953 Grand Final against the South Sydney Rabbitohs. 

After 17 games, this was his last season with the club. He transferred to Parkes, New South Wales in 1954 and Captain/coached the local team and later in 1954, Bracken played against England in the combined Western Division team. Parkes won the Group Eleven competition in 1954 under the coaching of Bracken.

External links
 http://brackenboats.net/football-career/

References 

1931 births
Living people
Australian rugby league players
Rugby league halfbacks
Rugby league players from Yass, New South Wales
St. George Dragons players